Dorothy Catherine of Brandenburg-Ansbach (23 February 1538, Ansbach – 18 January 1604, Toužim) was a princess of Brandenburg-Ansbach and by marriage burgravine of Meissen.

Life 
Dorothy Catherine was a daughter of the Margrave George of Brandenburg-Ansbach (1484–1543) from his third marriage to Emilie (1516–1591), daughter of Duke Henry of Saxony.

She married on 2 February 1556 in Gera Henry V of Plauen, Burgrave of Meissen (1533–1568). The wedding of the financially ailing burgrave was celebrated with splendor: 1,500 guests were there, with 970 horses, 250 of them noblemen. The wedding celebration plunged Henry into considerable debt, which caused him to conclude the treaty of Annaberg with Elector August of Saxony a few weeks later, on 13 March. This treaty led to the loss of Vogtland.

From her marriage, Dorothy Catherine had four sons, all named Henry. They were born between 1557 and 1567; they all died in infancy.

Dorothy Catherine died in 1604 and was buried next to her husband in the Mountain Church in Schleiz.

References 
 Karl Friedrich Pauli: General Prussian state history, including all of its kingdoms, electorates, duchies, principalities, counties and lordships, from reliable sources and documents, up to the present government, CP Francken, 1762, p. 475 f.
 John Gottlieb Jahn: Documentary History of the town of Oelsnitz and the castle and the district of Voigtsberg, Expedition des Oelsnitzer, 1841, p. 69

Footnotes 

1538 births
1604 deaths
House of Hohenzollern
Margravines of Germany
People from Ansbach
Daughters of monarchs